"Native New Yorker" is a disco song written by Sandy Linzer and Denny Randell. It was first recorded in 1977 by Frankie Valli and released on his album Lady Put the Light Out. Later in 1977 the song became a hit single for the soul dance band Odyssey, reaching No. 3 on the U.S. disco chart. Odyssey's "Native New Yorker" also went to No. 6 on the soul chart and No. 21 on the Billboard Hot 100. It reached No. 5 on the UK Singles Chart.

The group recorded the song at House of Music, a private recording studio on Pleasant Valley Way in West Orange, New Jersey. Jeffrey Kawalek was the recording and mix engineer. Richard Tee played its signature piano track.  Jim Bonnefond assisted on many sessions.  Studio owner Charlie Conrad did additional engineering, and added additional instrumental solos to the original mixes to create extended dance versions. Sandy Linzer added Tommy Mandel on clavinet and played hair drum himself on the mix that would be released as a single, engineered by Billy Radice at Olmstead studios 
in New York City.

"Native New Yorker" was also recorded by  Esther Phillips in 1978, and Black Box in 1998.

It was later sampled by Rich Cronin's band, Loose Cannons, for their song "New York City Girls," as well as by the house music group, Kluster, in their song featuring Ron Carroll, entitled "My Love".

The tenor saxophone solo on Odyssey's recording is played by Michael Brecker. George Young was part of the horn section, where he played alto sax.

Chart history

In popular culture
The song is featured in an episode of Good Times, "That's Entertainment, Evans Style" (1978), as well as the films Eyes of Laura Mars (1978); 54 (1998); A Guide to Recognizing Your Saints (2006); The Nanny Diaries (2007), a commercial for The Tonight Show Starring Jimmy Fallon (2014), Colin Quinn: The New York Story (2016), and Spider-Man: No Way Home (2021). It also served as background music towards the end of the preliminary swimsuit segment of the 1981 Miss Universe pageant in New York City; it is typically played during lead-in segments of Good Day New York. The song opens the 3rd episode of the 3rd series Pose (2021) entitled "The Trunk".

"Native New Yorker" is played after every New York City FC soccer game at Yankee Stadium.

Television personality Wendy Williams (as 'Lips') performed a rendition of the song on the fourth season of the American TV series The Masked Singer. Following her performance, multiple memes and reenactments were created.

References

External links
  (Frankie Valli)
  (Odyssey)

1977 singles
RCA Victor singles
Songs about New York City
Songs written by Sandy Linzer
1977 songs
Songs written by Denny Randell
Odyssey (band) songs
Frankie Valli songs